Elachista cana is a moth of the family Elachistidae. It is found in North America, where it has been recorded from Arizona, Colorado and Alberta.

The wingspan is 8.5-9.5 mm. The forewings are dull white. The base of the costa is fuscous and the wing is slightly dusted with pale ocherous fuscous-tipped scales. The hindwings are pale gray. Adults have been recorded on wing in June.

References

cana
Moths described in 1920
Moths of North America